Michelle Pearl Heyman (born 4 July 1988) is an Australian soccer player and commentator who currently plays for Canberra United in the W-League in Australia. She became the all-time record goalscorer in the W-League in March 2021, after scoring her 73rd goal. She has previously played for W-League teams Central Coast Mariners, Sydney FC, and Adelaide United as well as the Western New York Flash in the American National Women's Soccer League. Heyman has  represented Australia since 2010, playing at the 2014 AFC Women's Asian Cup, the 2015 FIFA Women's World Cup and the 2016 Summer Olympics. In May 2019 she retired from international football.

Club career

Heyman began playing at the age of 11 with the Warilla Wanderers. She later played for Port Kembla FC and Shellharbour City before signing with Illawarra Stingrays in the New South Wales Women's Super League (now NPL NSW Women's). She has returned to play for the Stingrays several times between W-League seasons.

Prior to the beginning of the 2008–09 W-League season, Heyman trialled for Sydney FC. Out of 120 triallists, she was one of only ten to be signed by the club.

Heyman signed from Sydney FC in the off-season to join Central Coast Mariners. On her debut for the Mariners, Heyman scored a double against her old club, Sydney FC.

In 2009, Heyman won the Golden Boot award for most goals scored during the League season along with the Julie Dolan Medal as the 2009 W-League player of the year.
 
In 2010, Heyman signed with Canberra United. During the 2011–12 W-League season, she was the leading goal-scorer in the league as Canberra United won the W-League premiership/championship double.

Heyman spent five months in 2012 playing in Denmark for Brøndby IF. She returned to Canberra United in time for the start of the 2012–13 W-League season.

On 9 July 2015, Heyman signed with US side Western New York Flash where she played nine matches in the 2015 National Women's Soccer League season.

In 2016, rejoined the Illawarra Stingrays in the NPL NSW Women's competition during the W-League off-season.

On 21 July 2018 it was announced that Heyman was leaving Canberra United after eight seasons. She made 93 appearances for Canberra, and scored 56 goals. She won the Golden Boot twice, and won two Championship Titles and three Premierships.

On 24 August 2018 Adelaide United announced they had signed Heyman to a one-year contract for the 2018–19 W-League Season. At the end of the season, Heyman left Adelaide. After a season not playing soccer, Heyman returned to the W-League, signing with Canberra United.

International career
Heyman made her debut for the national team in 2010. She was part of the 2014 AFC Women's Asian Cup squad that finished the tournament as runners-up. Heyman played five matches for Australia at the 2015 FIFA Women's World Cup. At the 2016 Summer Olympics, Heyman played four matches for the Australian team that was eliminated in the quarter finals.

Heyman was named to the Matildas squad for the 2018 AFC Women's Asian Cup, but she did not appear in any matches. Australia finished Runner-up to Japan and qualified for the 2019 FIFA Women's World Cup. In May 2019 she announced her retirement from international football.

Career statistics

International goals
Scores and results list Australia's score first.

Honours

International
Australia
 AFC Olympic Qualifying Tournament: 2016
Rio Summer Olympics 2016

Club
Canberra United
 W-League Premiership: 2011–12, 2013–14
 W-League Championship: 2011–12, 2014

Individual
 Julie Dolan Medal: 2009, 2021
 W-League Golden Boot: 2009, 2011–12

Personal life
Heyman is openly lesbian. She was the only openly gay Australian athlete at the 2016 Olympics.

References

External links

 
 Matildas player profile
 Western New York Flash player profile

1988 births
Living people
Australian women's soccer players
Sydney FC (A-League Women) players
Central Coast Mariners FC (A-League Women) players
Canberra United FC players
Adelaide United FC players
Lesbian sportswomen
Australian LGBT soccer players
Australian LGBT sportspeople
A-League Women players
Australia women's international soccer players
2015 FIFA Women's World Cup players
Footballers at the 2016 Summer Olympics
Sportswomen from New South Wales
Soccer players from New South Wales
Women's association football forwards
Western New York Flash players
Australian expatriate sportspeople in the United States
Expatriate women's soccer players in the United States
National Women's Soccer League players
Olympic soccer players of Australia